James Croke  (1789 – 10 March 1857) was Solicitor-General of Victoria (Australia) and a politician, a member of the Victorian Legislative Council.

Croke was born in County Cork, Ireland, the son of William Croke, a farmer. Croke was educated at Trinity College, Dublin. He was admitted to the Irish Bar in 1821 and practised in the Munster circuit.

Croke arrived in Sydney, New South Wales on Sydney on 25 July 1839 and in the Port Phillip District in November 1839. He was appointed Crown prosecutor and admitted Port Phillip Bar in 1841. 
On 21 July 1852, Croke was appointed Solicitor-General and a member of the old (unicameral) Victorian Legislative Council, 
replacing Edward Williams.
Williams was sworn-in in July 1852 and held the seat until resigning in January 1854, he then returned to England.

Croke died in Richmond Hill, Petersham, Surrey, England, on 10 March 1857.

References

 

1799 births
1857 deaths
Members of the Victorian Legislative Council
Solicitors-General of Victoria
Irish emigrants to colonial Australia
People from County Cork
19th-century Australian politicians
Alumni of Trinity College Dublin